The Álamo bus accident occurred on April 20, 2012 near the city of Álamo, Veracruz, Mexico, when a trailer broke loose from a truck and crashed into a passenger bus. Of the 70 people on board, 43 were killed in the crash, the other 17 citizens being seriously injured. Four minors were among the dead, a local municipal spokesman said. One local news network said the bus was carrying 70 passengers, but only had capacity for less than 60. As rescue workers recovered bodies from the wreckage, officials organized the transfer of the injured to hospitals in the nearby port city of Tuxpan.

The victims were workers traveling from Coatzacoalcos, a major port city in the southern part of the Mexican state of Veracruz, to the northern border state of Coahuila, according to the authorities. The vehicles were said to have been traveling in opposite directions along the highway early on Friday when the rear trailer of the truck decoupled, smashing into the bus. The accident happened in a part of the road called the Curva del Diablo. According to Reuters, the accident occurred in a part of Mexico that has been overwhelmed by drug-related gang violence in recent years. Another collision on Friday between a passenger bus and a truck on a road in State of Jalisco killed one and injured 36, reported AFP.

Reactions 
President of Mexico, Felipe Calderón, expressed his sadness over the crash in a message posted on his Twitter account. Veracruz's governor, Javier Duarte, and his wife visited the accident site to oversee the rescue and recovery efforts, promising state support for victims and their families.

See also 
Acayucan bus crash, similar Mexican bus-truck crash in 2014
2022 Tamaulipas bus crash, similar Mexican bus-truck crash in 2022
List of traffic collisions (2000–present)

References 

2012 road incidents
2012 in Mexico
Bus incidents in Mexico
History of Veracruz
April 2012 events in Mexico